Sydney Michelle Miramontez (born October 11, 1994) is an American professional soccer player who plays as a defender for Kansas City in the National Women's Soccer League (NWSL).

She previously played for Utah Royals FC and FC Kansas City in the NWSL, the Western Sydney Wanderers in the Australian W-League, the University of Nebraska, and the GSI Pride of the Women's Premier Soccer League (WPSL).

Early life 
Miramontez grew up in Lenexa, Kansas and first played youth soccer for Andy Barney and the Kansas City Legends. At age 12 Sydney joined the KCFC Heat and played for Gags Pritchard then Blue Valley under FC Kansas City head coach Vlatko Andonovski. With the KCFC Heat she won three Kansas State Cup titles. Miramontez attended Shawnee Mission West High School, where she scored 52 goals and 52 assists in four years, and still holds the school record for career goals, career assists and single-season assists.

College career

Nebraska Cornhuskers, 2013–2016 
Miramontez attended the University of Nebraska where she played for the Cornhuskers from 2013 to 2016. She started 48 of 75 appearances and scored six goals and 14 assists. As a senior, she led the Cornhuskers in assists and earned second-team All-Big Ten accolades. She also achieved third-team NSCAA All-Great Lakes Region and Big Ten All-Tournament Team status.

Club career

FC Kansas City, 2017 
On August 2, 2017, Miramontez was signed by FC Kansas City after a successful spell training and playing with the GSI Pride. She made her debut in a 2–2 draw at the Boston Breakers on August 4.

Utah Royals FC, 2018–2019
After FC Kansas City ceased operations following the 2017 season, Miramontez was officially added to the roster of the Utah Royals FC on February 8, 2018.

On February 19, 2020 Miramontez announced her retirement from professional soccer. She made 14 appearances with Utah over her two seasons with the club.

Kansas City NWSL, 2021
On December 23, 2020 Miramontez came out of retirement after signing a one year contract with Kansas City NWSL.

References

External links 
 
 US Soccer player profile
 FC Kansas City player profile
 Nebraska Cornhuskers player profile

1994 births
Living people
American women's soccer players
FC Kansas City players
National Women's Soccer League players
Nebraska Cornhuskers women's soccer players
People from Lenexa, Kansas
Soccer players from Kansas
Sportspeople from the Kansas City metropolitan area
Utah Royals FC players
Women's association football defenders
Kansas City Current players